Ron Troupe is a fictional character appearing in American comic books published by DC Comics.

Charles Jarman portrayed the character in the first season of the Arrowverse television series Superman & Lois.

Publication history
Ron Troupe debuted in The Adventures of Superman #480 (July 1991) and was created by Jerry Ordway and Tom Grummett.

Fictional character biography
Along with Cat Grant, he is one of the most enduring characters of the Daily Planet bullpen created in DC's Post-Crisis Universe. He first appeared in The Adventures of Superman #480 (July 1991) where he was turned down for a job at the Daily Planet by acting-editor Sam Foswell. In the following issue, he got a job at Colin Thornton's Newstime magazine when Jimmy Olsen was late for his interview. Shortly afterwards, he was fired from Newstime and hired by Perry White, who had returned to the Planet. During the Reign of the Supermen, White compared Troupe's piece on the Cyborg Superman to the first Superman stories by Lois Lane and Clark Kent.

Troupe was one of the Planet's more level-headed reporters, and not as likely as Lois or Jimmy to get into situations he cannot get out of, although he was still prepared to run risks in pursuit of a story. He  twice took on the racist supervillain Bloodsport II. During events following the selling of Daily Planet to LexCorp, Ron Troupe and Lois Lane's sister Lucy Lane were romantically involved. He married Lucy, and had a son, Samuel Troupe, named for Lucy's father Sam Lane. 
Between the events of Infinite Crisis and The New 52 revamp of Superman continuity, Ron and Lucy's relationship was not explored. Lucy worked in Washington D.C. for the military and Ron was still in Metropolis; the canonical status of their relationship appeared to remain untouched following the events of the Infinite Crisis as Ron appeared in a flashback to Sam Lane's funeral, but the events that drove Ron and Lucy apart were unrevealed. According to Action Comics Annual #11 (May 2008), Ron Troupe is the most highly educated reporter on staff at the Daily Planet, and has more awards than anyone else at the paper. It is also stated that he is known for his political editorials, he is an avid activist in too many groups to list, and he often butts heads with Daily Planet Sports Editor Steve Lombard on nearly everything.

His relationship with Lombard is highlighted in the 'Brainiac' storyline, where the two come into verbal conflict over the manner each chooses to cover sports related topics. However, both work together when alien robots invade the Daily Planet, even saving Cat Grant's life in the process.

The 2009-2010 miniseries Superman: Secret Origin established that Troupe, in post-Infinite Crisis continuity, was already on the staff of the Daily Planet when Clark Kent began working at the newspaper.

In other media

Television
 Ron Troupe made several brief appearances in Superman: The Animated Series, voiced by Dorian Harewood. Troupe also made regular background cameos in the Daily Planet throughout the series.
 Ron Troupe made non-speaking cameos in various episodes of Justice League and Justice League Unlimited. He was usually seen in scenes set in Metropolis. Notably, Troupe appeared alongside Lois Lane, Jimmy Olsen, and Perry White in the series finale "Destroyer".
 In Smallville, Ron's byline appears on a Daily Planet article in Season 8 about a mysterious Red-Blue Blur (Clark Kent) that has appeared all over Metropolis, saving people. In the Season 10 episode "Icarus", a file on Lois Lane lists Ron and Samuel Troupe as her relatives. Ron himself does not appear on the series until the Season 10 episode "Booster", where he is portrayed by P.J. Prinsloo.
 Ron Troupe is alluded and appears in the shows set in Arrowverse:
 In Arrow, Ron wrote an article for the Starling City Sentinel detailing Holder Group's acquittal of charges for selling faulty smoke defectors. Sometime afterwards, he became a journalist for The Starling City Star. Ron wrote an article on Scott Morgan having his plant initiate brownouts in The Glades. He later covered Peter Declan's impending execution for The Starling City Star. Troupe was among those who wrote a piece on Adam Hunt's loss with Hunt Multinational. Ron reported that Thea Queen could be facing trial for a DUI.
 In The Flash, Ron's byline appears briefly on an article titled "Local Doctor Kills Wife, Son Survives" in the first-season episode "The Man in the Yellow Suit".
 In the second part of Arrowverse crossover "Crisis on Infinite Earths", it is revealed that on Earth-96 Ron and other Daily Planet staff were murdered by an insane criminal from Gotham City. Clark Kent would later place his name on the wall of his office to remember those who died.
 Ron appears in the Superman & Lois episode "A Brief Reminiscence In-Between Cataclysmic Events", portrayed by Charles Jarman.

Film
 Ron Troupe appears as a background character in All-Star Superman. The character does not have any lines in the film, but appears in the Daily Planet scenes alongside Jimmy Olsen, Cat Grant, and Steve Lombard.
 Ron Troupe appears in Superman: Unbound, voiced by Michael-Leon Wooley. Troupe and Jimmy Olsen defeat some of Brainiac's robots by shoving a desk against them and pushing them out the window.
 Ron Troupe appears in Reign of the Supermen voiced, uncredited, by Nyambi Nyambi.  
 Ron Troupe appears in Superman Red Son, voiced by Phil LaMarr.
 Ron Troupe appears in Superman: Man of Tomorrow, voiced by Eugene Byrd.

Miscellaneous
 Though not appearing on The Batman, Ron Troupe has a cameo appearance in the spin-off comic book The Batman Strikes! in issue #44. He appears in the Daily Planet when Bruce Wayne pays a visit.
 Ron Troupe is featured in the Smallville Season 11 digital comic based on the TV series.
 Ron Troupe appears in a marketing article published by Wired for the film Batman v Superman: Dawn of Justice.

References

External links
DCU Guide: Ronald Troupe
Superman Homepage: Ronald Troupe

Fictional reporters
Fictional African-American people
Comics characters introduced in 1991
Characters created by Jerry Ordway
Superman characters